For Chastity, or Namus Uğruna in Turkish, is a 1960 Turkish drama film directed and written by Osman F. Seden.

Cast
Eşref Kolçak   
Peri Han   
Serpil Gül   
Memduh Ün   
Suphi Kaner   
Diclehan Baban   
Mualla Sürer   
Nuri Ergün   
Eşref Vural

External links 

Films set in Turkey
1960 films
1960s Turkish-language films
1960 drama films
Turkish crime drama films
Turkish black-and-white films